The Eeries are an American rock band formed in 2012 with members from Fullerton, California; Munster, Indiana; Torrance, California, and the town of Schio near Venice, Italy. They are best known for their lead singer's 21-month-long marriage to Frances Bean Cobain. Their single "Cool Kid" charted at number 33 on the Alternative Songs chart.

History
The Eeries have released one self-titled EP via Interscope Records. On December 9, 2014, The Eeries performed their single "Cool Kid" on Late Night with Seth Meyers.

Band members
Isaiah Silva - lead vocals/guitars
Brandon Sweeney – lead guitar/backup vocals
Eliot Lorango – bass/backup vocals
Nadir Maraschin – drums
Mark Lear – banjo string test lead

Discography

Extended plays
The Eeries (2014)

References

American rock music groups
Musical groups established in 2012
Interscope Records artists
2012 establishments in California